, subtitled Their standing points, is a 1999 Japanese original video animation created and directed by Makoto Shinkai. Shinkai's first animation work, it is a five-minute story about the relationship between a male cat and his female owner told from the cat's perspective. Shinkai made the film to help a romantic interest overcome a difficult situation, and his time living in a small apartment defined the scenario. The film used his own hand-drawn illustrations and its 3D scenes were mainly done through Adobe After Effects. He also voiced the cat, and he had only the cooperation of three other people in the work.

After completing the work, Shinkai himself distributed the film via CD-R format and mail, selling 5,000 copies at anime conventions. The work was well received, winning the 2000 DoGA CG Animation Contest and attracting CoMix Wave Films' interest. The company re-released the film in CD-ROM format and hired Shinkai. Years later, in 2016, it was adapted into an anime television series and a manga.

Plot
The story occurs over the span of a year. On a rainy Spring day, She finds Chobi outside and brings him home with her. Chobi falls in love with his owner because of her kindness and beauty. During the summer Chobi gets a girlfriend, Mimi. Mimi loves Chobi and wants to marry him, but he refuses because he is in love with Her. On an autumn day, She has a long conversation over the phone. When it is over She cries and becomes depressed. Chobi does not understand what the conversation was about or what happened but concludes that it was not her fault. He stands by Her and comforts her. Time goes on and it becomes winter. She continues going to work and moves on with her life. In the end, She and Chobi are happy with their life together and say in unison, "I think that the both of us probably like this world."

Production
She and Her Cat was written and directed by Makoto Shinkai; it is his first major animation work. He had the idea in 1997, but started it in 1998 while he was working as a graphic designer at Falcom, a video game company. Because he experimented with computer graphic animation during his work, he wanted to minimize complex procedures. So he opted to do a black-and-white film since a colored-one would use three times as much space in the computer and it would also make the process three times slower. He was working on a role-playing game, whose genre is known to have "very rich and detailed" surroundings, and this influenced the film's background details. He also took pictures of cityscapes and the streets, and used them as a basis for his hand-drawn animations. The composition of 3D scenes was done with Adobe After Effects and for other effects Shade, Illustrator and LightWave were used.

Shinkai described it as a "personal film" because it was made to encourage the girl he was in love with to go through some problems she had. The cat was the main character because he had cats since he was a child and adopted some stray cats in Tokyo. His own time living in a small apartment surrounded by electrical lines also inspired the main scenario. Although these are "ugly things", he "wanted to make it look detailed and beautiful to express that it was ok to live in such a situation". He aimed to transmit the feelings of "the vague loneliness of living", "slight pain" and "modest warmth", and as he thought it would be difficult to do it through words he did it through images and sound. Shinkai affirmed: "Without being too eager, I just let the animation speak for itself. I'm pleased with its simplicity."

Although most of the work had been done by Shinkai, who also provided the voice of the cat, he had three collaborators for the film: Mika Shinohara, who provided the voice for She and also did some illustrations; Tenmon, who composed the music; and "Rabsaris", who was credited for his "cooperation".

Release and reception
After it was completed in 1999, Shinkai made his own copies of She and Her Cat on CD-R and sold around 5,000 copies at Comiket and by mail through his website. It received critical acclaim, and won the grand prize at the 2000 DoGA CG Animation Contest. Anime authors Colin Odell and Michelle Le Blanc called it "simple, underplayed and just a little maudlin". Chris Beveridge of Mania.com watched the three versions and said "each looks gorgeous and the story for it is simply hauntingly beautiful". In a 2017 retrospective, Anne Lauenroth of Anime News Network ranked it Shinkai's ninth best work (out of 11), praising its use of lighting that gives "a modest beauty" to the scenery and its "carefully placed details" that transmits the wholeness of a world only partially presented.

She and Her Cat was the work that made Shinkai popular and it led him to work on the production company CoMix Wave Films, for which he produced his other films. At first he received "a very long e-mail" from the company in which there was a review telling why they appreciated the work and he was subsequently hired. The movie caught the attention of Mangazoo (who would become Comix Wave) and the company released the movie in a CD-ROM format. It contained its soundtrack and three different versions of the movie: the full five-minute version, a three-minute version, and a one-minute-and-half digest version. After it was out of print, it was also included in the DVD release of Voices of a Distant Star as an extra.

The only version to reach the United States is the subtitled version that comes with Voices of a Distant Star released by ADV Films in June 2003. The DVD includes the three different versions of the film. British company Anime Limited released the work as a special feature on their release of The Place Promised in Our Early Days/Voices of a Distant Star in 2016.

Legacy
An anime television adaptation, subtitled Everything Flows, was first announced in January 2016 through the February issue of Kadokawa Shoten's Newtype magazine. The anime was produced by Liden Films Kyoto Studio and directed by Kazuya Sakamoto. It aired between March 4 and 25, 2016 as part of Tokyo MX's Ultra Super Anime Time programming block. Crunchyroll made the anime available via stream worldwide except for Asia starting on March 4. In Japan, the anime was released in Blu-ray and DVD on May 18, 2016, and it included a "complete edition" with additional footage, including a 90-second opening sequence. This edition received a theatrical release from May 21 to 27, at the Tollywood theater in Shimokitazawa, Tokyo. The DVD and the Blu-Ray release sold 230 and 1,521 copies respectively, appearing at 18th and 6th place on Oricon's best-selling list on their respective categories. On May 26, 2020, the anime was released in Blu-ray in the United States by Discotek Media with English subtitles and a new dub.

A manga version by Tsubasa Yamaguchi adapting the anime was announced in the March 2016 issue of Kodansha's Monthly Afternoon, and it began serialization in the magazine's April 2016 issue, which was released in February 2016, ending its serialization in May 2016. Its single collected volume was released by Kodansha on August 23, 2016. In January 2017, Vertical licensed the series, and it released the manga in the North American market on August 1 of that year.

References

Books

External links
  
 

1999 animated films
1999 anime OVAs
1999 drama films
1999 films
1999 short films
1990s animated short films
Animated drama films
Animated films about cats
Animated television shows based on films
Anime short films
Anime with original screenplays
CoMix Wave Films films
Doujin anime
Drama anime and manga
Films directed by Makoto Shinkai
Japanese drama films
Japanese short films
Kodansha manga
Liden Films
Japanese independent films
Seinen manga
Single OVAs
Toho Animation
Tokyo MX original programming
Vertical (publisher) titles